The Great Þjórsá Lava (Icelandic: Þjórsárhraunið mikla ) is the largest lava flow in Iceland (by both area and volume) and the largest lava that is known to have erupted in a single eruption in the Holocene. It belongs to a group of lavas known as the Tungnaá lavas. It was erupted in the Veiðivötn region, Central Iceland, 8600 years BP (6600 BC). The crater area is covered by younger lavas and eruptives. The Þjórsá Lava does not appear on the surface until 70 km downstream of its supposed crater area.

In the lowlands of South Iceland the lava has overflown wide areas, covering the districts Landsveit, Gnúpverjahreppur, Skeið and Flói. The sea level seems to have been around  lower than today when the lava was erupted. Along with the rising sea level the ocean has transgressed the lava front so its border line is submerged several hundreds of metres off-shore and an interesting littoral zone can be inspected along the beach.

The towns of Selfoss, Eyrarbakki and Stokkseyri are built on the lava. The Þjórsá lava is porphyritic with large light coloured feldspar phenocrysts sitting in a dark, fine grained ground mass.

Approach 
The littoral part of the Great Þjórsá Lava can be inspected off the seawalls of Stokkseyri and Eyrarbakki. During low tide the Atlantic waves break at the submerged lava front far off-shore but closer to the beach small channels in between flat lava skerries, grown with seaweed, indicate the landscape.

References 
 Árni Hjartarson 1988: „Þjórsárhraunið mikla - stærsta nútímahraun jarðar“. Náttúrufræðingurinn 58: 1-16.
 Árni Hjartarson 1994: „Environmental changes in Iceland following the Great Þjórsá Lava Eruption 7800 14C years BP“. In: J. Stötter og F. Wilhelm (ed.) Environmental Change in Iceland (Munchen): 147-155.

Bárðarbunga
East Volcanic Zone of Iceland
Holocene volcanism
Lava fields
Lava flows